Suskunlar, is a Turkish television drama, broadcast on Show TV in 2012. Drama was remade in USA for NBC as Game of Silence; being the first Turkish drama sold to the USA market.

It was aired in over 30 countries and it is based on a true story of children who were sentenced in absentia to nine years in prison on the charge of stealing a baklava car in Gaziantep in 1997.

Plot

Four young boys drive a baklava car without knowing how and accidentally hit and injure an old man. They are tried in their absence and sentenced to several years in prison. In the prison, they endure hard treatment and abuse. As adults, they try to help kids that are still being abused by going to court. But the prison is playing dirty.

Cast

Main cast 
 Murat Yıldırım: Ecevit Oran (Şerif)(Sheriff)
 Sarp Akkaya as Bilal Tutkun (Sarı)(Yellow)
 Güven Murat Akpınar as İbrahim Kene (Iska)(be off target)
 Tugay Mercan as Zeki Sinanlı (Yanık)(Scald)
 Aslı Enver as Ahu Kumral (her unused nickname "Gazelle, Bambi")

Cast 
 Berk Hakman as Gurur Kutay/Gazanfer Bircan(Kasap)(Butcher)
 Reha Özcan as Sait Karam
 Mehmet Özgür as İrfan Alkara (Takoz)(Chock)
 Pelin Akil as Nisan/Nur Ağazade
 Pelin Doğru as Birsen
 Jale Aylanç as Ümran Kene
 Murat Garipağaoğlu as Sermet
 Metin Coşkun as Naim Oran (Belalı Naim/Trouble Naim)
 Fırat Albayram as Hasan (Çakal/Jackal)
 Hakan Gerçek as Hoca (Damat)(Groom)
 Fatih Paşalı as Özcan Tiryaki (Yarasa)(Bat)
 Alican Yücesoy as Cebrail (Gabriel)
 Emir Faruk Uğurcan as Samet (Samet)

Children 
 Furkan Didim as Ecevit (Şerif)
 Emirhan Akbaba as Bilal (Sarı)
 Berkcan Çakar as İbrahim (Iska)
 Ulaşcan Kutlu as Zeki (Yanık)
 Yağmur Esmer as Ahu
 Barış Öner as İrfan (Takoz)
 Mert Çolak as Özcan (Yarasa)
 Efe Akercan as Gazanfer (Kasap)

International broadcasts

Awards

External links 
 Suskunlar Trailer English in YouTube
 
 Suskunlar Official website

References 

Turkish drama television series
2012 Turkish television series debuts
2012 Turkish television series endings
Show TV original programming
Television shows set in Istanbul
Television series produced in Istanbul
Television series set in the 2010s